Sosnovka is a rural locality (a selo) in Selenginsky District, Republic of Buryatia, Russia. The population was 26 as of 2010. There is 1 street.

Geography 
Sosnovka is located 68 km southwest of Gusinoozyorsk (the district's administrative centre) by road. Shana is the nearest rural locality.

References 

Rural localities in Selenginsky District